Lobería Partido is a partido on the Atlantic coast of Buenos Aires Province in Argentina.

Economy
Like its neighbouring partidos on the Atlantic coast, the economy of Lobería is dominated by the summer vacation season (December–February), which sees hundreds of thousands of Porteños make their way to the Atlantic coastline.

During the rest of the year the main economic activities are mainly related to farming and cattle breeding.

Attractions
Museo de Ciencias Naturales, Lobería (Natural Sciences Museum of Loberia)
Museo Histórico, La Lobería Grande

Settlements
 Lobería (district capital)
 El Lenguaraz
 El Moro
 Las Nutrias
 Licenciado Matienzo
 Los Pitos
 Pieres
 San Manuel
Arenas Verdes beach

Notable People from Lobería
José Arce, President of the United Nations General Assembly in 1948.

References

External links

 
 Official Tourist Guide

1891 establishments in Argentina
Partidos of Buenos Aires Province